Macronemus antennator is a species of beetle in the family Cerambycidae. It was described by Johan Christian Fabricius in 1801.

References

Acanthoderini
Beetles described in 1801